The pitis was a tin coin issued by several South-East Asian states. It may refer to:

 Brunei pitis
 Cash coins in Indonesia
 Palembang pitis
 Kelantan keping
 Trengganu keping
 Pitis (Madrid Metro), a station on Line 7